A parole bond is a deposit of money or property made to the government as surety that a paroled prisoner will not violate the terms of his release. The prisoner may fund the bond himself; or he may borrow from friends or family; or he may obtain the services of a bondsman, in exchange for a fee. Part of the theory behind it is that those who are asked to put up the money or cosign the loan have an incentive to verify that the parolee does not represent an unacceptably high risk prior to helping with his release; and they have an incentive to help him stay out of trouble after his release. The prisoner has an incentive to be on good behavior during his incarceration in order to demonstrate he has reformed and thus would not be at high risk of violating parole. While on parole, the prisoner has an incentive not to violate the terms, lest the bond be forfeited, which would likely cause difficulties in obtaining the surety of family, friends, or bondsmen in the future. Parole bonds are sometimes used as a way of relieving overcrowded prisons. It is based on the very similar concept of bail bonds; and just as with bail bonds, some statutes allow the bondsman to get back all or a portion of the bond by surrendering the prisoner to the authorities. This may require the use of bounty hunters to locate and capture him. Organizations like the National Association of Bail Insurance Companies and the American Legislative Exchange Council (ALEC), a national bipartisan group of conservative legislators, have pressed the idea that financially secured postconviction release works far better than unsecured release.

References

Sureties
Parole